Paula Fox (April 22, 1923 – March 1, 2017) was an American author of novels for adults and children and of two memoirs. For her contributions as a children's writer she won the biennial, international Hans Christian Andersen Award in 1978, the highest international recognition for a creator of children's books. She also won several awards for particular children's books including the 1974 Newbery Medal for her novel The Slave Dancer; a 1983 National Book Award in category Children's Fiction (paperback) for A Place Apart; and the 2008 Deutscher Jugendliteraturpreis for A Portrait of Ivan (1969) in its German-language edition Ein Bild von Ivan.

In 2011, she was inducted into the New York State Writers Hall of Fame. The NYSW Hall of Fame is a project of the Empire State Center for the Book. Her adult novels went out of print in 1992. In the mid nineties she enjoyed a revival as her adult fiction was championed by a new generation of American writers.

Early life
Paula Fox was born in New York City on April 22, 1923. Her mother, Elsie De Sola, was Cuban and a screenwriter. Her father, Paul Hervey Fox, wrote screenplays and taught English. After he divorced Elsie, he had 3 sons and a daughter with his second wife, Mary.

Elsie De Sola Fox rejected her daughter Paula at birth and she and Paul left her in a foundling home. Her maternal grandmother, Candelaria de Sola, temporarily visiting New York City, rescued her and she was moved around Florida, Cuba and the US. Unable at the time to provide a home herself, Candelaria gave the infant to Reverend Elwood Corning and his bedridden mother in Balmville, New York.

Corning treated Fox kindly and taught her important lessons. When she first visited her parents at age five, her mother treated her like a prisoner of war. As she wrote in her memoir Borrowed Finery, the reunion was so traumatic that "I sensed that if she could have hidden the act she would have killed me."

In 1944, Fox was living in the household of famed acting coach Stella Adler and became friendly with Marlon Brando, another of Adler's students who was living there. She became pregnant and gave the child, Linda Carroll, up for adoption. There have been persistent rumors that Brando was in fact Carroll's father, although neither Brando nor Fox ever commented on the matter. Carroll, who became an author and psychotherapist, is the mother of musician Courtney Love. Visual artist Frances Bean Cobain is Fox's great-granddaughter.

Career
Fox attended the Columbia University School of General Studies from 1955-58 and married Richard Sigerson, by whom she had two sons. She later married literary critic and translator Martin Greenberg, and worked for years as a teacher and  tutor for troubled children. Only in her 40s did she begin her first novel, Poor George, about a cynical schoolteacher who finds purpose—and ruin—in mentoring a vagrant teenager. The novel was received well (Bernard Bergonzi in the New York Review of Books calling it "the best novel I've read in a long time") but sold poorly, a pattern that all her adult novels would follow. Desperate Characters came next with Alfred Kazin calling it a "brilliant performance" and "quite devastating" while Lionel Trilling described it as "a reserved and beautifully realized novel". By 1992 all six of her novels were out of print.

In 2011 she was inducted into the New York State Writers Hall of Fame. The Writers Hall of Fame is a project of the Empire State Center for the Book. She was championed by the author Jonathan Franzen, who saw that some of her books were re-issued.

Fox died at age 93 in Brooklyn on March 1, 2017.

Adaptations
A Portuguese Feature Film Coitado do Jorge based on Poor George was directed by Jorge Silva Melo in 1993. Desperate Characters was made into a movie starring Shirley MacLaine in 1971.

Works

Children's fiction
1966 Maurice's Room (illustrated by Ingrid Fetz)
1967 How Many Miles to Babylon? (illus. Paul Giovanopoulos)
1967 A Likely Place (illus. Edward Ardizzone)
1968 Dear Prosper (illus. Steve McLachlin)
1968 The Stone-Faced Boy (illus. Donald A. Mackay)
1969 Hungry Fred (illus. Rosemary Wells)
1969 The King's Falcon (illus. Eros Keith)
1969 Portrait of Ivan (illus. Saul Lambert)
1970 Blowfish Live in the Sea
1973 Good Ethan (illus. Arnold Lobel)
1974 The Slave Dancer (illus. Eros Keith)
1978 The Little Swineherd and Other Tales (1996 edition illus. Robert Byrd)
1980 A Place Apart
1984 One-Eyed Cat
1986 The Moonlight Man 
1987 Lily and the Lost Boy (also as The Lost Boy) 
1988 The Village by the Sea (also as In a Place of Darkness)
1991 Monkey Island
1993 Western Wind
1995 The Eagle Kite (also as The Gathering Darkness)
1997 Radiance Descending
1999 Amzat and His Brothers: Three Italian Tales

Memoirs
2001 Borrowed Finery
2005 The Coldest Winter: A Stringer in Liberated Europe

Adult fiction
1967 Poor George
1970 Desperate Characters
1972 The Western Coast
1976 The Widow's Children
1984 A Servant's Tale
1990 The God of Nightmares
2011 News from the World: Stories and Essays

See also 

List of Cuban American writers
List of Famous Cuban-Americans

Notes

References

External links

 Paula Fox at Boyds Mills Press
 
Interviews
 .
 Interview by Ramona Koval for The Book Show on ABC Radio National (July 29, 2004).
 Interview with short biography by Jesse Lichtenstein for Loggernaut (no date)
 The Rumpus Long Interview with Paula Fox by Greg Gerke (January 24, 2010)

1923 births
2017 deaths
20th-century American novelists
American children's writers
American women novelists
American writers of Cuban descent
Columbia University School of General Studies alumni
Hans Christian Andersen Award for Writing winners
Hispanic and Latino American novelists
Members of the American Academy of Arts and Letters
National Book Award for Young People's Literature winners
Newbery Medal winners
Newbery Honor winners
Writers from New York City
21st-century American women writers
American women children's writers
Women science fiction and fantasy writers
20th-century American women writers
21st-century American writers
Novelists from New York (state)